The Fall is the third extended play by Canadian country music artist Dallas Smith. It was released in Canada on March 15, 2019 via 604 Records and Fontana North. The EP was nominated for Album of the Year at the 2019 CCMA Awards as well as Country Album of the Year at the 2020 Juno Awards.

All four singles released from the project reached #1 on Billboard's Canada Country chart: extending Smith's record-holding number of #1 hits on the chart among Canadian artists all-time to nine.

Content
The EP was noted to have more of a country pop approach than Smith’s previous music. Fellow country singers Tyler Hubbard and Brian Kelley of Florida Georgia Line, Morgan Wallen, Hardy, Steven Lee Olsen, Randy Houser and Brett Eldredge were among the songwriters. "Make 'Em Like You"  and "Rhinestone World" were previously released as singles and became Smith’s 6th and 7th Canadian country #1s. "Friends Don’t Let Friends Drink Alone" featured fellow Canadian country singers Dean Brody and MacKenzie Porter. The trio performed the song together on the similarly named "Friends Don’t Let Friends Tour Alone Tour” which Smith and Brody co-headlined in late 2019.

Track listing

Chart performance

EP

Singles

Awards and nominations

Release history

References

2019 EPs
Dallas Smith EPs
604 Records albums
Albums produced by Joey Moi
Canadian Country Music Association Top Selling Canadian Album albums